The Mediterranean Agreements (German Mittelmeerentente; French Entente de la Méditerranée) were a series of treaties signed in 1887 by Great Britain with Italy on 12 February (through the mediation of Germany), with Austria-Hungary on March 24 and with Spain on May 4. Further notes were exchanged between Britain, Italy and Austria-Hungary on 12 December.

On the face of it the treaties recognised the status quo in the Mediterranean Sea. In fact, one of the objectives was to halt the expansion of the Russian Empire in the Balkans and her wish to control the straits of the Bosphorus and Dardanelles. From that perspective it also assured the survival of the Ottoman Empire. It also protected Italian interests against France. Thus it united forces hostile to Russia in the Balkans and to France in North Africa.

From the point of view of the German chancellor Otto von Bismarck, the benefit of these agreements to which Germany was not a party, was in bringing Britain closer to the Triple Alliance of Germany, Italy and Austria-Hungary.

The treaty potentially conflicted with the Reinsurance Treaty of 1887, between Germany and Russia. In the secret protocol to the Reinsurance Treaty, Bismarck lent support to Russia's expansion efforts. Thus the Mediterranean Agreement, while not a de jure contradiction of the Reinsurance Treaty was at least contrary to its spirit.

Bibliography 
 W. N. Medlicott. The Mediterranean Agreements 1887. The Slavonic Review Vol. 5, No. 13 (Jun., 1926), pp. 66-88
 Pribram, Alfred, ed. (1921) The Secret Treaties of Austria-Hungary. Vol. 2. Cambridge, MA: Harvard University Press. pp. 47-57, 71-78 (Text of Agreements)
 Gregor Schöllgen, Imperialismus und Gleichgewicht. Deutschland, England und die orientalische Frage 1871–1914, Munich, Oldenbourg, 2000, p. 23
 Die Grosse Politik der Europäischen Kabinette

Treaties of the United Kingdom (1801–1922)
Treaties of the Kingdom of Italy (1861–1946)
History of the Mediterranean
19th-century military alliances
1887 treaties
Italy–United Kingdom relations
Treaties of Spain
Austria-Hungary